Elk Park Pass, elevation , is a mountain pass on the Continental Divide in southwestern Montana, about  northeast of Butte. It is traversed by Interstate 15 and is one of three crossings of the Divide by the Interstate (all in Montana), the others being Monida Pass (on the border with Idaho) and Deer Lodge Pass southwest of Butte. Elk Park Pass lies on the border between Silver Bow and Jefferson counties and is remarkable for its highly asymmetrical nature. The approach from the north is through namesake Elk Park, a high, mostly treeless plain (like South Park in Colorado or the Sierra Valley in California), and the grade is almost imperceptible.

At one time Elk Park Pass was also traversed by a railroad line, constructed by the Great Northern Railway and later operated by its successor, Burlington Northern. However, this line was abandoned in 1972.

References 

Landforms of Silver Bow County, Montana
Landforms of Jefferson County, Montana
Mountain passes of Montana
Rail mountain passes of the United States